This is a list of members of the 30th Legislative Assembly of Queensland from 1944 to 1947, as elected at the 1944 state election held on 15 April 1944.

 On 24 December 1945, the Country member for East Toowoomba, Herbert Yeates, died. Labor candidate Les Wood won the resulting by-election on 2 March 1946.
 On 12 March 1946, the Labor member for Bremer and Premier of Queensland, Frank Cooper, retired. Labor candidate Jim Donald won the resulting by-election on 10 September 1946.
 On 30 December 1946, the Country member for Wide Bay, Harry Clayton, died. No by-election was held due to the proximity of the 1947 state election.

See also
1944 Queensland state election
Cooper Ministry (Labor) (1942–1946)
Hanlon Ministry (Labor) (1946–1952)

References

 Waterson, D.B. Biographical register of the Queensland Parliament, 1930-1980 Canberra: ANU Press (1982)
 

Members of Queensland parliaments by term
20th-century Australian politicians